SinoVision is a U.S.-based Chinese language television network. SinoVision has offices in Lower Manhattan, Flushing, and Brooklyn. It has correspondents in Washington, D.C., Boston, Chicago, Los Angeles, San Francisco and Houston. 

SinoVision was founded in 1990 by personnel dispatched to the U.S. from the Overseas Chinese Affairs Office and its China News Service to counter negative perceptions of the Chinese government following the 1989 Tiananmen Square protests and massacre. SinoVision is formally owned by Asian Culture and Media Group, which also owns the newspaper The China Press.

According to academics Larry Diamond and Orville Schell, "SinoVision’s content echoes China’s official media. The vast majority of its stories about China, Sino-American relations, Taiwan, Hong Kong, and other important issues for the PRC government are taken directly from official Chinese media outlets or websites, including CCTV, Xinhua, and the People’s Daily."

See also 

 The China Press
 China News Service

References

External links
 

Television networks in the United States
Television channels and stations established in 1990
Chinese-language television
Chinese-language mass media in the United States
Mass media in New York City
Entertainment companies based in New York City
Organizations associated with the Chinese Communist Party
United front (China)